Kenneth Sidney "Snowy" Svenson (6 December 1898 – 7 December 1955) was a New Zealand rugby union player. A second five-eighth and three-quarter, Svenson represented Wanganui, Buller, Wellington and Marlborough a provincial level, and was a member of the New Zealand national side, the All Blacks, from 1922 to 1926. He played 34 matches for the All Blacks including four internationals.

References

1898 births
1955 deaths
Sportspeople from Toowoomba
Australian emigrants to New Zealand
New Zealand rugby union players
New Zealand international rugby union players
Wanganui rugby union players
Buller rugby union players
Wellington rugby union players
Marlborough rugby union players
Rugby union centres
Rugby union players from Queensland